Devil's Island is a 1939 American prison film directed by William Clemens and starring Boris Karloff. This film is notable for Karloff in a then-rare sympathetic role, as opposed to his usual antagonistic characters in horror films. The plot appears to have been recycled from John Ford's The Prisoner of Shark Island, which depicted the true story of doctor Samuel Mudd, who treated the injury of John Wilkes Booth after he assassinated Lincoln.

Plot
For upholding his medical oath in treating a wounded revolutionary, respected surgeon Dr. Charles Gaudet (Boris Karloff) is sentenced to ten years imprisonment to the infamous French penal colony on Devil's Island. It isn't long before he speaks out against the inhuman conditions and incurs the anger of the brutal prison commander, Colonel Armand Lucien (James Stephenson). But when Lucien's daughter Collette receives life-threatening wounds in an accident, the only person on Devil's Island who can save her is Gaudet.

Cast

 Boris Karloff as Dr. Charles Gaudet
 Nedda Harrigan as Madame Helene Lucien
 James Stephenson as Colonel Armand Lucien
 Adia Kuznetzoff as Pierre Leroux
 Rolla Gourvitch as Collette Lucien
 Will Stanton as Bobo Hawkins
 Edward Keane as Duval, Camp Doctor
 Robert Warwick as Demonpre, Minister of the Colonies
 Pedro de Córdoba as Defense Attorney Marcal
 Tom Wilson as Emil
 John Harmon as Andre Garon
 Sidney Bracey as Soupy, a Prisoner (as Sidney Bracy)
 George Lloyd as Dogface
 Charles Richman as Governor Beaufort
 Stuart Holmes as Gustave LeBrun
 Leonard Mudie as Advocate General
 Egon Brecher as Debriac, LeBrun's Henchman
 Frank Reicher as President of Assize Court

Production
The film was originally made when France announced it was giving up Devil's Island as a penal colony. The French government then changed its mind. Warners temporarily shelved the film then released it.

Reception
The film depicts the French judicial system as antiquated, unfair, and biased. The depiction of Devil's Island upset the French government. They put a two month ban on any Warners film entering France or its colonies.

Fear of something similar happening resulted in a proposed 1947 film from Columbia, The End of Devil's Island, being cancelled.

See also
 Boris Karloff filmography

References

External links

1939 films
1939 drama films
American drama films
American black-and-white films
1930s prison films
Films directed by William Clemens
Warner Bros. films
Films set on Devil's Island
1930s English-language films
1930s American films